Wassane Sihinaya or theatrically Senehasaka Sihinaya,, is a 2021 Sri Lankan Sinhala drama thriller film directed and produced by Nihal Sanjaya with the help of Anton Kingsley and Irfan Senudeen who were the previous co-director and producer respectively. The film stars Sanath Gunathilake, Kanchana Mendis, Roshan Pilapitiya in lead roles along with Dayananda Jayawardana, Cletus Mendis and Nilanthi Dias in supportive roles. A special screening of the film was held at the Liberty Scope Cinema in Kollupitiya.

Cast
 Sanath Gunathilake
 Kanchana Mendis
 Roshan Pilapitiya
 Dayananda Jayawardana
 Cletus Mendis
 Nilanthi Dias
 Manjula Thilini
 Nelum Perera
 Sandali Welikanna

Production
In the year 2003, renowned film producer Soma Edirisinghe produced a film with the involvement of Indian artists where Nihal Sanjaya was the executive producer and artist coordinator. At that time, Sanjaya started his own production company called 'Kisel Arts'. The film was first produced by a friend of Nihal Sanjaya named Irfan Senudeen. Sanjaya was mostly in China when the film was shot in Sri Lanka under the director Anton Kingsley. After shooting completed, all the post-production work was done in India. This 35mm film was then brought to Sri Lanka. After many years, Sanjaya went back to India and scanned the film in 2K technology and made a digital copy. Irfan, the original producer, had financial problems and sold the entire production rights to the director Sanjaya.

Delay
According to the director, the legal ownership of the film was transferred to him about 12 years ago in 2009. Initially it was titled Senehasaka Sihinaya but the original producer had renamed it Wassane Sihinaya. Even though Censor certificate obtained with the title Wassane Sihinaya in 2009, later National Film Corporation was not aware of that name. At the same time, National Film Corporation claimed that there was an outstanding payment due to an artiste for the film. So, Sanjaya had to wait few more years to clearly absolved of all outstanding payments. Later in 2021, he was able to release the film in CEL circuit with the title Senehasaka Sihinaya.

References

2020s Sinhala-language films
2021 films
Sri Lankan drama films
2021 drama films